Protobothrops elegans is a venomous pitviper species endemic to Japan in the southern Ryukyu Islands. No subspecies are currently recognized. Common names include: elegant pitviper, and elegant tree viper.

Description
Scalation includes 25 (sometimes 23) rows of dorsal scales at midbody, 179–192 (males) or 182–196 (females) ventral scales, 63–90 subcaudal scales, and 8 (sometimes 7 or 9) supralabial scales.

During 1965–2011, 2447 snakebites from this snake are reported with one fatality.

Geographic range
It is found in Japan in the southern Ryukyu Islands, specifically in the Yaeyama Islands. The type locality is unknown. Boulenger listed it as "---- ?" while Gray's original 1849 description gives "West Coast of [North?] America." A restriction to "Ishigaki-Shima [Ryukyu Islands, Japan]" was proposed by Stejneger (1907).

See also
Snakebite

References

Further reading
 Gray, J.E. 1849. Catalogue of the Specimens of Snakes in the Collection of the British Museum. Trustees of the British Museum. London. xv + 125 pp. (Craspedocephalus elegans, p. 7.)

elegans
Snakes of Asia
Endemic reptiles of Japan
Endemic fauna of the Ryukyu Islands
Reptiles described in 1849
Taxa named by John Edward Gray